"Drop It Like It's Hot" is a song by American rapper Snoop Dogg featuring fellow American musician Pharrell Williams. It was released on September 27, 2004, as the lead single from Snoop Dogg's seventh studio album, R&G (Rhythm & Gangsta): The Masterpiece (2004). The song was produced by the Neptunes.  It is regarded as an iconic song, with Snoop performing the chorus and the second and third verses while Pharrell performs the first verse.

The song topped the US Billboard Hot 100 for three weeks, making it both artists' first number one on the chart. It was also Snoop's fourth top-ten as a solo artist, first since 2003's "Beautiful" (the others being 1993's "What's My Name?" and 1994's "Gin and Juice"). The song also gave him his first number one on the Hot R&B/Hip-Hop Songs chart. It also peaked at number one for four consecutive weeks in New Zealand, and number ten in the UK Singles Chart. It gained some critical attention for its minimal, extremely sparse production, consisting of tongue clicks, keyboards, a drum machine beat and white noise.  It was nominated at the 2005 Grammy Awards for Best Rap Song and Best Rap Performance by a Duo or Group. Two songs "Jesus Walks" by Kanye West and "Let's Get It Started" by Black Eyed Peas respectively won the former and latter awards. The single was Pharrell's biggest hit worldwide, until 2013's "Get Lucky", "Blurred Lines", and "Happy", the latter being his biggest single as a lead artist.

On December 10, 2009, "Drop It Like It's Hot" was named the most popular rap song of the decade by Billboard.

Origin of song title
The phrase "drop it like it's hot" was already in common use before the song was released, and had been used in various songs since the 1990s. It is a metaphorical description of a dance move commonly performed by women, and is performed by various women throughout the music video. It was used in Positive K's 1992 album The Skills Dat Pay Da Bills, in the song "Ain't No Crime." It was also used by Lil Wayne as a guest rapper on Juvenile's 1999 hit single "Back That Azz Up" from his album 400 Degreez, and in his own song called "Drop It Like It's Hot" from his 1999 debut album Tha Block is Hot featuring B.G. and Mannie Fresh. Clark Kent said "drop it like it's hot" in the song "Cashmere Thoughts" from Jay-Z's 1996 debut album, Reasonable Doubt. DJ Quik used the phrase in the song "Sexuality" from his album Balance & Options. Another song with the same name is "Drop It Like It's Hot", sung by the Big Tymers, and featuring Chilli, Juvenile, and Lac. This version of the song was featured in the Big Tymers' predecessor of their debut, How You Luv That Vol. 2.

Outside of hip-hop, it was also the title of a song on indie rock band Minus the Bear's 2002 EP Bands Like It When You Yell "Yar!" at Them.

Critical reception
USA Today called the song "scorching". Rolling Stones Tom Moon said "The serpentine down-tempo single 'Drop It Like It's Hot', produced by the Neptunes, links Snoop's slyly exuberant delivery to a relentless dance-floor bounce". Steve "Flash" Juon of Rap Reviews wrote: "the stripped down sound of the Neptunes produced 'Drop it Like It's Hot' has produced one of Snoop's biggest hits to date. Ironically it may be in some ways more gangsterish than his "Deep Cover" debut in some aspects, but he's so chill about his delivery it doesn't sound the least bit menacing: That's quintessential Snoop for you - hard when you're not looking, but still velvet enough to appeal to the ladies and drive off in a fly Mercedes". Similarly, AllMusic's David Jeffries stated: "the ultrahot production team the Neptunes' contribution to the killer single 'Drop It Like It's Hot' had been duly noted, but lost in all the chatter was how inspired and on-fire Snoop sounds".

Music video
The music video of the single was released in 2004. It was directed by Paul Hunter and shot in black-and-white. It shows Snoop Dogg doing the dance step known as the Crip Walk in the very beginning and end. The video included both of Snoop Dogg's sons, Corde and Cordell. Other appearances in the video include Terry Kennedy, Lauren London, Pharrell Williams' fellow Neptunes member Chad Hugo, and Pusha T.

The video won the award for the best hip hop video at the 2006 MTV Australia Video Music Awards and a MOBO Award for Best Video in 2005.

Radio edits
There are two radio edits for the song: one is a standard radio edit that removes profanities and drug references while the other is an "Extra Clean" edit that removes phrases with gun and gang references (and the word "roll" from the chorus) as well.

Commercial performance

North America
"Drop It Like It's Hot" was the highest-ranking debut for the Billboard Hot 100 chart dated October 2, 2004, entering the chart at number 51. The song topped the US Billboard Hot 100 for three weeks from December 10, 2004. The song also reached number one on Hot R&B/Hip-Hop Songs, R&B/Hip-Hop Airplay, Rap Songs, Rhythmic Songs, Digital Songs and Hot 100 Airplay.

Since its release the song has been certified Gold by the RIAA. The Mastertone (ringtone) version received certification of double platinum by the RIAA.

Europe
The single reached number ten on the UK Singles Chart, and reached the top ten in several countries.

Oceania 
The song topped the Recorded Music NZ for four weeks, making it Snoop Dogg's first number one on the chart.

Track listing
CD single
Drop It Like It's Hot (featuring Pharrell) — 4:32
Get 2 Know U (featuring Jelly Roll) — 3:36

Remixes
The official remix features new verses from Snoop Dogg, Pharrell Williams, and a verse from Jay-Z dissing R. Kelly for suing him, which appeared on the bonus CD of the Boss'n Up DVD.MTV
 English drum and bass producer Roni Size performed a remix with Dynamite MC on BBC Radio 1's Live Lounge on 10 January 2005.
Glitch-hop producer Edit also created an unofficial, unreleased remix, which can be found on various mixtapes.
Lil Wayne released a remix of the song, titled "Nah This Ain't the Remix", on his mixtape The Dedication. He takes shots at Snoop Dogg for using his line, with lines like "don't touch my shit nigga" and "I rock a red flag.." However, he claimed that he was not mad at Snoop, saying in the song, "When I first heard this I got a little upset but then I thought to myself, what haven't I done yet?" and later, "Nah, I ain't hatin', don't get me wrong, I made it a hot line, you made it a hot song. Peace." It can be taken as a reference to Jay-Z's song dissing Nas, "Takeover", in which Jay-Z says: "I sampled your voice, you was usin' it wrong, you made it a hot line, I made it a hot song."

Mashups
Mashup artist Party Ben mashed "Drop It Like It's Hot" with the Led Zeppelin song "Whole Lotta Love".
dj BC mashed up the song with Nu Shooz's I Can't Wait.
A Mashup by an unknown Artist was featured in the 10th Victoria's Secret Fashion Show in 2005. It is mashed with the song Plaine Ma Plaine by french composer Paul Mauriat. The Mashup was uploaded to the streaming platform Soundcloud in 2013 by Kurt Mamisao, however he is not considered the artist.

Samples
Jamie Foxx's hit "Blame It" (featuring T-Pain) sampled the song with a cameo appearance by Snoop Dogg at the 2009 BET Awards.

Parodies
MADtv did a parody music video of "Drop It Like It's Hot" called "Smokin' Too Much Pot." (The real song also contains references to marijuana.)
A remix of the song uses a new sample of the Gap Band song "Outstanding". The remix features E-40, Killer Mike,  Warren G and Jadakiss.
British comedian Lenny Henry performed an elaborate parody of the song, complete with a music video closely mimicking that of the original, on the second episode of his 2005 comedy series, The Lenny Henry Show.
"Weird Al" Yankovic included a few lines from the song in "Polkarama!", a medley of popular songs set to polka music on his 2006 release Straight Outta Lynwood.
Carlos Mencia parodied rappers who went to jail in his new rap video on Mind of Mencia. He parodied Snoop's "Drop It Like It's Hot", DMX's "Ruff Ryders Anthem" and Mystikal's "Shake It Fast".
Bulgarian comedy rappers DJ Damian & Dinamit parodied the video of "Drop It Like It's Hot" and Fat Joe's song Lean Back (Remix) (produced by Lil Jon) in their song "Kachak" ("Къчак") satirizing the lifestyle of the gypsies of Bulgaria.
The music video was parodied by country group Hot Apple Pie for their 2005 video "Hillbillies".
Snoop Dogg adapted the song to "Pocket Like It's Hot" in an advertising campaign for Hot Pockets
Iman "Alphacat" Crosson made a parody of the song which focuses on Barack Obama's presidency and his health care, ObamaCare.
Kendrick Lamar parodied the song on his first mixtape Hub City Threat: Minor Of The Year, which he recorded in 2003.

Covers and other media
The song was covered by the German band The BossHoss on their 2007 release Stallion Battalion.
Jimmy Fallon and Justin Timberlake covered the song in a "History of Rap" skit.
The song was covered by German singer Lena Meyer-Landrut.

Soundtrack appearances
The song appears in the game Dance Central for Kinect on the Xbox 360, in a commercial for the soft drink Sun Drop, the 2013 animated film Turbo and its soundtrack (using the clean radio version) and the 2019 animated film The Addams Family.
The song was featured on the NBA 2K15 soundtrack.
The song was featured in The Wire, Season 3, Episode 12, "Mission Accomplished".
A remixed version of the song is available as downloadable content for the music video game series Rock Band. The song features the original vocal track (censored to maintain an ESRB "Teen" rating) with an added electric guitar and bass line, as well as an expanded drum pattern.

Trivia
Snoop Dogg's cousin Sasha Banks took her stage name and persona The Boss from the lyrics "Da Big Bo$$ Dogg, yeah I had to do that" after the late Dusty Rhodes mentioned to her about Snoop being her cousin after struggling to create a persona for the WWE.
Coincidentally, at WrestleMania 32, Snoop escorted Sasha (and performed a freestyle rap) for her entrance and also changed the lyrics "I'm a gangsta, but y'all knew that/Da Big Bo$$ Dogg, yeah I had to do that" to "She's a legit boss, but y'all knew that/Da Big Bo$$ Dogg, yeah I had to do that" in her entrance music.
The song was performed at the 2011 Mnet Asian Music Awards alongside The Next Episode during the "Legendary Hip-hop stage" segment.
 In 2018, Ski Mask the Slump God released the Stokeley album, which featured "Foot Fungus", an interpolation of "Drop It Like It's Hot".

Charts

Weekly charts

Year-end charts

Decade-end charts

Certifications

Release history

See also
 List of number-one singles from the 2000s (New Zealand)#2005
 List of Hot 100 number-one singles of 2004 (U.S.)
 List of number-one R&B singles of 2004 (U.S.)
 List of Billboard number-one rap singles of the 2000s
 List of Billboard Rhythmic Top 40 number-one songs of the 2000s

References

2004 singles
2004 songs
Snoop Dogg songs
Pharrell Williams songs
Billboard Hot 100 number-one singles
Music videos directed by Paul Hunter (director)
Number-one singles in New Zealand
Song recordings produced by the Neptunes
Songs written by Pharrell Williams
Songs written by Chad Hugo
Songs written by Snoop Dogg
Geffen Records singles
Star Trak Entertainment singles
Black-and-white music videos